Dulhan Wahi Jo Piya Man Bhaye may refer to:
 Dulhan Wahi Jo Piya Man Bhaye (1977 film), a Hindi musical drama film
 Dulhan Wahi Jo Piya Man Bhaye (2021 film), a Bhojpuri-language romantic drama film